Trichomegaly is a congenital condition in which the eyelashes are abnormally long, greater than 12mm in the central area and 8mm in the peripheral. The term was first used by H. Gray in 1944 in a publication in the Stanford Medical Bulletin, though he was only the third person to characterize the disorder; the first two reports were published in German in 1926 and 1931 by Reiter and Bab, respectively. Gray suggested the use of the term "movie lashes" to describe this condition, for long lashes were at the time being portrayed in film as a desirable characteristic in women.

Etiology 
There are several causal agents for this disorder; these can be divided into three main categories and include the following:

Congenital Syndromes 
 Oliver–McFarlane syndrome
 Cornelia de Lange Syndrome
 Cone-rod dystrophy
 Tetralogy of Fallot
 Hermansky–Pudlak syndrome
 Goldstein Hutt Syndrome
 Phylloid hypomelanosis
Smith-Lemli-Opitz Syndrome

Acquired disorders 
 Areata alopecia
 Connective tissue disorders, such as
 Lupus
 Dermatomyositis
 Hen fever
 Atopic dermatitis
 HIV/AIDS
 Renal metastatic Adenocarcinoma
 Eating disorders, such as Anorexia nervosa
 Pregnancy

Drugs 
 Prostaglandin analogues
 Cetuximab
 Bimatoprost, Latanoprost
 Phenytoin
 Minoxidil
 Ciclosporin
 Topiramate
 Streptomycin
 Systemic corticosteroids
 Penicillamine

Diagnosis

See also 
 Trichomycosis axillaris
 List of cutaneous conditions

References 

Conditions of the skin appendages